The 2020 Florida Atlantic Owls baseball team represented Florida Atlantic University in the sport of baseball for the 2020 college baseball season.  The Owls competed in Division I of the National Collegiate Athletic Association (NCAA) and the Conference USA.  They played their home games at FAU Baseball Stadium, on the university's Boca Raton, Florida, campus.  The team was coached by John McCormack, who was in his eleventh season at Florida Atlantic. On March 16, 2020, the Conference USA announced that all spring sport competition and championships, including baseball, have been cancelled.

Previous season

The 2019 Owls finished 41–21 overall, and 22–8 in the conference. They lost in the Athens Regional during the 2019 NCAA Division I baseball tournament.

Preseason

C-USA media poll
The Conference USA pre poll was released on January 29, 2020 with the Owls predicted to finish in second place.

Schedule and results

Schedule Source:

Roster

Coaching staff

Rankings

Awards

References

Florida Atlantic
Florida Atlantic Owls baseball seasons
Florida Atlantic Owls baseball